Alberto Losada Alguacil (born 28 February 1982) is a Spanish former road bicycle racer, who competed professionally between 2006 and 2017 for the Kaiku,  and  squads.

Major results

2004
 3rd Vuelta a Cantabria
2005
 4th Overall Vuelta a Navarra
 9th Overall Volta a Lleida
2006
 2nd Overall Escalada a Montjuïc
 7th Overall Vuelta a La Rioja
1st Young rider classification
 10th Overall Rheinland-Pfalz Rundfahrt
 10th Gran Premio de Llodio
2007
 8th Overall Volta ao Alentejo
 9th Overall Vuelta a La Rioja
2008
 6th Overall Vuelta a Andalucía
 10th Overall Tour de l'Ain
2009
 10th Overall Vuelta a Chihuahua
2010
 7th Vuelta a La Rioja
2013
 8th GP Miguel Induráin
2015
 8th Overall Volta ao Algarve

Grand Tour general classification results timeline

References

External links 

Spanish male cyclists
1982 births
Living people
Cyclists from Barcelona